Keep It Up Downstairs is a 1976 British period sex comedy film, directed by Robert Young and starring Diana Dors, Jack Wild and William Rushton. Alternative titles for the film include Can You Keep It Up Downstairs? and My Favorite Butler.

Plot
The film follows the adventures of the sex-crazed inhabitants of the bankrupt Cockshute Castle in 1904, and the attempts of Lord and Lady Cockshute to find a rich wife for their uninterested inventor son Peregrine.

Cast
 Diana Dors as Daisy Dureneck
 Jack Wild as Peregrine Cockshute
 William Rushton as Snotty Shuttleworth
 Aimi MacDonald as Christabelle St. Clair
 Françoise Pascal as Mimi
 Neil Hallett as Percy Hampton
 Mark Singleton as Lord Cockshute
 Julian Orchard as Bishop
 Simon Brent as Rogers
 Sue Longhurst as Lady Cockshute
 John Blythe as Francis Dureneck
 Carmen Silvera as Lady Bottomley
 Seretta Wilson as Betsy-Ann Dureneck
 Anthony Kenyon as Mellons
 Olivia Munday as Lady Kitty Cockshute
 April Olrich as Duchess
 Sally Harrison as Maud
 Mary Millington as Polly

Production

Filming
A version exists with hardcore inserts; these were shot with body doubles for the main stars. It was shot at Elstree Studios and on location at Knebworth House in Hertfordshire.

Casting
It was one of a number of British sex comedies featuring Diana Dors.

Music
It also contains the first score by Michael Nyman in a commercially released film.

References

External links

Keep It Up Downstairs at BFI
Keep It Up Downstairs at Letterbox DVD
Keep It Up Downstairs at TCMDB

1976 films
Films set in 1904
Films shot at EMI-Elstree Studios
1970s English-language films
Films directed by Robert Young
1970s sex comedy films
1970s historical comedy films
British sex comedy films
British historical comedy films
Films set in England
Films scored by Michael Nyman
1976 comedy films
1970s British films